Roman Szymański (4 August 1840, Kostrzyn - 18 December 1908, Poznań) was a Polish political activist, publicist, editor of Orędownik magazine.

References

 Witold Jakóbczyk, Przetrwać na Wartą 1815-1914, Dzieje narodu i państwa polskiego, vol. III-55, Krajowa Agencja Wydawnicza, Warszawa 1989

1840 births
1908 deaths
People from Poznań County
People from the Grand Duchy of Posen
Polish activists
Polish publicists